Aphnaeus jacksoni, the Jackson's highflier, is a butterfly in the family Lycaenidae. It is found in northern Uganda and Kenya (from the north-western part of the country to the area north of Mount Elgon).

References

Butterflies described in 1954
Aphnaeus